North-West Bay refers to a body of water in south eastern Tasmania.

History
"NORTH-WEST BAY.-This was discovered and charted by D'Entrecasteaux. It is the "Fairlies Harbour" of Hayes."

References

Bays of Tasmania